Datu Paglas, officially the Municipality of Datu Paglas (Maguindanaon: Ingud nu Datu Paglas; Iranun: Inged a Datu Paglas), is a 4th class municipality in the province of Maguindanao del Sur, Philippines. According to the 2020 census, it has a population of 33,682 people.

History
Datu Paglas was created out of 7 northern barangays of the municipality of Columbio on November 22, 1973, by Presidential Decree No. 340. While Columbio was made part of the province of Sultan Kudarat, Datu Paglas was made part of the province of Maguindanao.

In 2021, Bangsamoro Islamic Freedom Fighters occupied the market.

Geography

Barangays
Datu Paglas is politically subdivided into 23 barangays.

Alip (Poblacion)
Bonawan
Bulod
Damalusay
Damawato
Datang
Elbebe
Kalumenga (Kalumanga)
Katil
Lipao
Lomoyon
Madidis
Makat
Malala
Mangadeg
Manindolo
Mao
Napok
Palao sa Buto
Poblacion
Puya
Salendab
Sepaka

Climate

Demographics

Economy

Notable people
Lav Diaz, filmmaker

References

External links
Datu Paglas Profile at the DTI Cities and Municipalities Competitive Index
[ Philippine Standard Geographic Code]
Philippine Census Information
Local Governance Performance Management System

Municipalities of Maguindanao del Sur
Establishments by Philippine presidential decree